Velveteen is a type of cloth.

Velveteen may also refer to:
Velveteen (album), a 1989 album by Transvision Vamp
"Velveteen", a song from the Ghost in the Shell:Stand Alone Complex original soundtrack
"Velveteen", a song by Sponge from Wax Ecstatic

See also

The Velveteins, Canadian rock band
The Velvet Teen, an American indie rock band